Mein Mehru Hoon is a Pakistani soap opera directed by Naeem Qureshi and written by Saira Arif. It aired on ARY Digital in 2017 every Monday to Thursday. It was first aired on 11 July 2016 and concluded on 28 September 2017.

Cast

Ahmed Hassan/Arsalan Faisal as Shakeel
Imran Aslam as Azhar
Sidra Batool as Mehru
Anumta Qureshi as Ramsha
Tipu Shareef as Khaleel
Nazia Malik
Zaheen Tahir
 Sundas Guzlzar
Shahzeen Tariq 
Ayaz Samoo
Syed Fazal Hasnain

Plot

References

External links 
 

Pakistani drama television series
Pakistani television soap operas
2016 Pakistani television series debuts
2017 Pakistani television series endings
Urdu-language television shows
ARY Digital original programming
ARY Digital